Frenks Razgals (born 8 August 1996) is a Latvian professional ice hockey player currently playing for HK Poprad of the Slovak Extraliga.

He's the son of Latvian coach and former hockey player, Aigars Razgals. He represented Latvia at the 2017 and 2018 IIHF World Championships.

Career statistics

Regular season and playoffs

References

External links

1996 births
Living people
Dinamo Riga players
HK Riga players
HC Vítkovice players
AZ Havířov players
JKH GKS Jastrzębie players
HK Zemgale players
HK Liepājas Metalurgs players
HK Dukla Trenčín players
HK Poprad players
Latvian ice hockey forwards
Ice hockey people from Riga
Latvian expatriate sportspeople in the Czech Republic
Latvian expatriate sportspeople in Slovakia
Latvian expatriate sportspeople in Poland
Latvian expatriate ice hockey people
Expatriate ice hockey players in the Czech Republic
Expatriate ice hockey players in Slovakia
Expatriate ice hockey players in Poland